Benguerra Island Airport is an airport on Benguerra Island, Mozambique. The nearest major airport is Vilankulo Airport on the mainland of Mozambique.

References 

Airports in Mozambique